Ernest Thompson Cox (February 19, 1894 – April 29, 1974) was a Major League Baseball pitcher who played in one game for the Chicago White Sox on May 5, . He faced six batters, gave up one hit, two walks, and two earned runs for a career ERA of 18.00.

References

External links

1894 births
1974 deaths
Chicago White Sox players
Major League Baseball pitchers
Baseball players from Alabama